Malai Malai is a 2009 Indian Tamil-language masala film written and directed by A. Venkatesh. The film stars Arun Vijay, Vedhika, Prabhu, Prakash Raj and Kasthuri in lead roles. while, Santhanam, Ganja Karuppu, Vijayakumar and S. N. Lakshmi play supporting roles. The music was composed by Mani Sharma with editing by V. T. Vijayan.

The film released on 31 July 2009 and turned out to be a surprise hit at the box office. This film ran for 100 days in theaters.

Synopsis 
Palanivel and Vetrivel are inseparable brothers who eke out a living as a farmer and minivan driver respectively in a village on the foothills of Palani temple. When Vetri falls in love with a city-based RJ Anjali, who is on a visit to Palani, he finds Lakshmi to romance his brother. Meanwhile, Vetri goes to Chennai in search of a job and his ladylove. He gets a job as a driver in a courier company, where Vimala Hassan, a fanboy of Kamal Haasan, is an employee and becomes Vetri's friend. Now enters Essaki, a dreaded don who controls Saidapet area of the city. He initially helps Vetri but soon locks horns with him. Palani comes to Chennai to meet Vetri and runs into Essaki, and it is revealed that they are childhood friends. In order to not worry his brother, Vetri does not mention the ongoing feud between him and Essaki, and circumstances do not let Essaki and Vetri meet in front of Palani.

Cast 

 Arun Vijay as Vetrivel
 Vedhika as Anjali
 Prabhu as Palanivel
 Prakash Raj as Essaki
 Kasthuri as Lakshmi
 Santhanam as Vimala Haasan
 Ganja Karuppu as Karuppu
 Vijayakumar as Assistant Commissioner of Police
 Riyaz Khan as Deputy commissioner
 S. N. Lakshmi as Vetri and Palani's grandmother
 Mayilsamy as Sketch Artist
 Aarthi as Arundathi
 O. A. K. Sundar as Pandidurai
 Dhandapani
 Pandu
 Thambi Ramaiah
 Lollu Sabha Manohar
 Singamuthu
 Shakeela
 Hemanth
 Bujji Babu
 Vengal Rao
 Vijay Ganesh
 Crane Manohar
 Chelladurai as Potential bride's father
 Daisy Shah (special appearance in the song "Othaiku Othaiya")

Production

Casting 
Pooja Umashankar walked out of the film due to the film's long delay to start. instead Vedhika was selected. Kasthuri was selected to play an important role making her comeback to Tamil cinema.

Filming 
Actor Arun Vijay and the cinematographers were arrested by the Thai army when the shoot was on for this film at Ko Man Islands near Pattaya City, It was only when the location manager and the producer explained the story to concerned officials that those arrested were released, The shooting came to a halt until the crew were released. The shooting of the film took place in Langavi Islands in Malaysia. Arun Vijay, Choreographer and Vedhika went as a team to the island for shooting. The shooting took place for a long time and by the time crew left it became dark and they missed the way and stranded in the mid sea for more than 2 hours but luckily they were saved. Set of the temple town Palani has been erected at Sriperambadhur for shooting of the film, Since the story of the film happens in Palani, set of the temple including market place, shops and streets have been erected in Sriperambadhur for 50 lakhs. A fight sequence featuring Arun Vijay clashing with the villains has been shot under the guidance of the stunt master Kanal Kannan. Scenes featuring Vedhika is also being shot here. Four cameras are being used for the shooting at this spot. Mumtaj was said to be appearing in an item number which proved false. During the shooting, the makers did a charity work to underprivileged rural areas. These donations have been used to provide adequate number of Ambulance facility to the villages of Ramanadhapuram, Pattukottai, Dindugal. Shooting for the climax has been on at Binny Mills and whilst acting out a stunt sequence involving jumping over the camera, Arun Vijay hurt his rib cage and arm. Luckily, the injuries weren't major and the actor went about shooting the scenes after rest for a couple of hours.

Music 

Soundtrack is composed by Mani Sharma and lyrics by Vaali. The audio was launched by Suriya in 2009.

{| class="wikitable" style="font-size:95%;"
|-
! No. !! Song !! Singers !! Lyrics !! notes
|-
| 1 || "Anbumanam" || Karthik, Rita Thyagarajan || rowspan=5|Vaali ||Based on Pillagali Allari from Athadu
|-
| 2 || "Nee Hello" || Jyotsna ||
|-
| 3 || "O Maare" || Ranjith, Saindhavi ||
|-
| 4 || "Othaikku Othaiyai" || Naveen, Rahul Nambiar ||
|-
| 5 || "Pooparikka" || Karthik, Shweta Mohan ||Based on Nammavemo from Parugu
|}

 Release 
The film was officially announced as a hit by the reports given by Top 10 movies in Kalaignar TV and other websites. It ran successfully for more than 100 days.

 Reception 
Kollywood today wrote: "There’s nothing exceptional you will be witnessing with Malai Malai". Oneindia wrote: "Director Venkatesh uses all his usual techniques to entertain the viewers. The techniques he has applied may be old but guaranteed for a 2 hours 30 minutes entertainment. Arun Vijay has successfully broken all the odds in the film Malai Malai and become a complete hero in this film through his good performance and heroine Vedhika also perform well in the sleek action masala. ". Sify wrote: "a typical mass masala movie with all essential ingredients". Nowrunning wrote: "Malai Malai an out-and-out Arun Vijay movie and Vedhika is apt for the role". Behindwoods wrote: "Scenes and narration are the same old run-of-the-mill types but for Prabhu’s and Prakash Raj’s friendship. Director had attempted to give something different but his efforts fall flat".

 Legacy 
The success of Malai Malai and breakout success of star Arun Vijay prompted the producers of the critically-reviled then-unreleased and shelved film Thunichal to use his newfound publicity to launch their own film, in which a pre-fame Vijay had starred. Arun Vijay, worried that the move could hamper his new-found image at the box office, lodged a complaint with the Nadigar Sangam, alleging that the producers of Thunichal were attempting to release the film without his voice. Soon after, he retracted his statements and refuted that the film would not damage his reputation.

After Malai Malai, the crew of previous film re-united with Maanja Velu which is a remake of Telugu film Lakshyam''. which also went on to become a hit at the box office.

References

External links 
 Malai Malai at Paadal.com
 

2009 films
2000s Tamil-language films
Films scored by Mani Sharma
Films shot in Palani
Films directed by A. Venkatesh (director)